Jorge Martín Plachot González (born June 1, 1975, in Montevideo, Uruguay) is a former Uruguayan footballer who has played for clubs in Uruguay, Paraguay, Chile, Honduras, Guatemala and El Salvador.

External links
 Jorge Plachot at playmakerstats.com (English version of ceroacero.es)
 Profile at Tenfield Digital Profile at 

1975 births
Living people
Uruguayan footballers
Uruguayan expatriate footballers
Footballers from Montevideo
C.A. Progreso players
Club Nacional footballers
C.D. Antofagasta footballers
Chilean Primera División players
Uruguayan Primera División players
Paraguayan Primera División players
Liga Nacional de Fútbol Profesional de Honduras players
Expatriate footballers in Chile
Expatriate footballers in Paraguay
Expatriate footballers in Honduras
Expatriate footballers in Guatemala
Expatriate footballers in El Salvador
Antigua GFC players
Association football forwards